Akodia is a town and a Nagar Panchayat in Shajapur District in the state of Madhya Pradesh, India.

Geography
It has an average elevation of 458 metres (1,503 feet).

Demographics
The Akodia city is divided into 15 wards for which elections are held every 5 years. The Akodia Nagar Panchayat has population of 11,652 of which 6,031 are males while 5,621 are females as per report released by Census India 2011.

Population of children with age of 0-6 is 1451 which is 12.45% of total population of Akodia (NP). In Akodia Nagar Panchayat, female sex ratio is of 932 against state average of 931. Moreover, the child sex ratio in Akodia is around 988 compared to Madhya Pradesh state average of 918.Literacy rate of Akodia city is 77.14% higher than state average of 69.32%. In Akodia, male literacy is around 87.29% while female literacy rate is 66.16%.

Akodia Nagar Panchayat has total administration over 2,247 houses to which it supplies basic amenities like water and sewerage. It is also authorized to build roads within Nagar Panchayat limits and impose taxes on properties coming under its jurisdiction.

History
Akodia Was Founded By Captain Timothy O'Donoghue, the leader of the British Expeditionary Force in 1914. in 1917 Mahatma Gandhi gave a speech at town square. here were three cotton mils in its golden history.

School And Institutions
 Sharda Convent Higher Secondary School
 Bright Star Higher Secondary School
 Govt. Boys Higher Secondary School
 Govt. Girls Higher Secondary School
 Saraswati Shishu/Vidhya Mandir 
 St. Alphonsa Convent high School
Sun rise public school
Sanskar public school
Kalidas academy 
Santiniketan maha vidhyal 
 Gita Public school

Gita Public High School

References

Cities and towns in Shajapur district